Harmeet Kaur Dhillon (born 1969) is an American lawyer and Republican Party official. She is the former vice chairwoman of the California Republican Party, and a National Committeewoman of the Republican National Committee for California. She is the founder of a law practice called Dhillon Law Group Inc. In 2018, she helped launch the nonprofit Center for American Liberty, which does legal work related to civil liberties. She is a regular guest on Fox News.

During the coronavirus pandemic, she filed numerous unsuccessful lawsuits to halt the implementation of stay-at-home-orders and other restrictions. She criticized face masks requirements, called for the re-opening of the economy, and opposed mail in voting.

In the January 2023 election, Dhillon unsuccessfully challenged incumbent Ronna McDaniel as chairperson of the Republican National Committee.

Early life and education
Dhillon was born in Chandigarh, India to a Punjabi Sikh family in 1969. Her family moved to the United States when she was a child so that her father could pursue a career as an orthopedic surgeon. Her family eventually settled in Smithfield, North Carolina. After finishing high school at age 16, she attended Dartmouth College. She became a writer and eventually editor-in-chief at The Dartmouth Review. After graduating from Dartmouth, she attended law school, graduating from the University of Virginia School of Law where she was on the editorial board of the Virginia Law Review. After law school, she clerked for Judge Paul Victor Niemeyer of the United States Court of Appeals for the Fourth Circuit.

Legal career and political activism

Political involvement
In 2008, Dhillon ran for a seat in the California Assembly. She lost the race, garnering 17% of the vote in the traditionally Democratic district. She ran for the California Senate in 2012, but was again unsuccessful. She served as the chair of the San Francisco Republican Party.

Dhillon became a board member of the northern California chapter of the American Civil Liberties Union after the September 11 attacks, in connection with her work on discrimination against Sikhs and other South Asians, and stayed on the board for three years. She has been heavily criticized by Republican activists for her ties to the ACLU, as well as her past contributions to the political campaigning of Kamala Harris.

Dhillon was chosen to be a member of the California Republican Party's Board in 2013; she became a national committeewoman for the Republican National Committee in 2016. She also gave the opening prayer at the 2016 Republican National Convention.

In early 2017, Dhillon interviewed to be the Assistant Attorney General for Civil Rights in the Department of Justice. She was not nominated for the position.

Dhillon led the successful effort to remove Chad Mayes as the California State Assembly Republican caucus leader in August 2017.

On July 11, 2019, Dhillon gave a speech at the President Trump's "Social Media Summit". Dhillon is a co-chair of Women for Trump. She has described Laura Ingraham as a "long-time mentor."

In December 2022, Dhillon announced her candidacy to replace Ronna McDaniel as chairperson of the Republican National Committee. In January 2023, Dhillon reportedly faced a whisper campaign from supporters of McDaniel and of Mike Lindell focusing on her Sikh faith. On January 11, 2023, McDaniel disavowed the attacks, citing her own minority Mormon faith. On January 27, 2023, Dhillon would lose to McDaniel in a 111-51 vote.

Lawsuits
Dhillon filed a lawsuit in April 2017 against University of California, Berkeley on behalf of the Berkeley College Republicans (BCR) and Young America's Foundation for freedom of speech issues, particularly the school cancelling Ann Coulter's speech quoting security reasons. The suit was settled in December 2018, with Dhillon arguing that it had forced the university to change its policies about controversial speakers, whereas the university maintained that it had already been following the amended policies before.

In August 2017, James Damore, a former Google employee, hired Dhillon to be his lawyer against Google. Dhillon's firm has said it is also willing to represent more employees from Google who have similar stories to Damore. though Dhillon has already lost an appeal to the National Labor Relations Board. Damore's lawsuit against Google also was dismissed pursuant to a mandatory arbitration clause; however, the case continues without him.

Conservative social media activist and journalist Andy Ngo retained Dhillon as his attorney after being assaulted on the street in Portland, Oregon, in June 2019. In June 2020, Dhillon filed suit on behalf of Ngo against antifa seeking $900,000 in damages for assault and emotional distress, and an injunction to prevent further harassment. The lawsuit cites Rose City Antifa, five other named defendants, and additional unknown assailants. It stems from multiple alleged attacks on Ngo in Portland during 2019, and accuses Rose City Antifa in particular of a "pattern of racketeering activities".

Coronavirus pandemic 
During the coronavirus pandemic, Dhillon was behind many lawsuits challenging stay-at-home orders enacted during the COVID-19 pandemic to halt the spread of the virus. By June 2020, she had filed more than a dozen lawsuits against California.

On April 13 and 24, 2020, Dhillon filed suits against the state of California challenging its stay-at-home order. On behalf of two pastors in Riverside County, two parishioners in San Bernardino County, and seven businesses, including restaurants, a pet grooming shop, and a gondola company, she argued that their constitutional rights were being violated. Dhillon also filed lawsuits against the governors of New Jersey and Virginia over their restrictions on religious services. Most of these lawsuits were filed through the Center for American Liberty. Dhillon later argued that her lawsuits led to "large sectors of California’s economy opening up much sooner than the governor originally intended", which in the assessment of The New York Times contributed to an "alarming surge in cases" in the second half of June. She criticized California's decision to send mail-in ballots to all registered voters for the 2020 election because of the public health risks of in-person voting during the coronavirus pandemic. In July 2020, it was reported that she was suing state and local governments in California to keep nail salons and barbers open and to prevent the closure of schools during the pandemic.

In May 2020, Dhillon criticized Virginia for requiring the use of face masks in public. She claimed that "the masks don't work" (contradicting the recommendation of health experts and the US CDC).

In June 2020, she criticized California for requiring the use of face masks in public when individuals were unable to physically distance. She argued that people should be free to make their own decisions. She called on California to reopen its economy, even though coronavirus cases were surging. In July 2020, she said that she was considering filing a lawsuit over a restriction on singing or chanting in church to prevent the spread of the coronavirus.

She filed a lawsuit against Hawaii when the state required that visitors to Hawaii undergo quarantine upon arrival. In July 2020, a judge ruled that the emergency mandate was a reasonable response to the public health threat posed by the coronavirus.

Detransitioning case
Dhillon's firm filed a lawsuit against Kaiser Permanente over misinforming and medical damage experienced by 18 year old detransitioner Chloe Cole of Central Valley, California. As California legally permits gender-affirming surgery for minors, Cole had a double mastectomy at age 15. The suit was preceded by a letter of intent to sue, addressed to Kaiser, a named endocrinologist, a named psychiatrist and a named plastic surgeon, claims that Cole is suffering from ongoing deleterious health effects from off label use of prescription drugs. Cole says that she was not properly informed as to potential negative effects of the puberty blockers and testosterone she was given at age 13. The lawsuit claims that Cole did not give informed consent and that she was under extreme duress to accede to the medical treatments.

Trump 2020 campaign legal adviser 
She was a legal adviser on the Trump 2020 campaign. While the Trump campaign was making claims of voter fraud during the 2020 election (as the ballots were being counted), Dhillon said the campaign was hoping that the Supreme Court, including Trump-appointed justices such as Amy Coney Barrett, would help Trump win the presidency.

References

External links 

 (law firm)
 (candidacy for Republican chair) and a supporter's campaign website. 

1968 births
American Civil Liberties Union people
American politicians of Indian descent
American Sikhs
California Republicans
Candidates in the 2008 United States elections
Candidates in the 2012 United States elections
Chandigarh politicians
Dartmouth College alumni
Indian emigrants to the United States
Lawyers from San Francisco
Living people
People from Sea Ranch, California
People from Smithfield, North Carolina
Republican National Committee members
University of Virginia School of Law alumni
Women from Chandigarh
Asian conservatism in the United States